The 2013–14 Chicago State Cougars women's basketball team represented Chicago State University during the 2013–14 college basketball season. The Cougars, led by eleventh year head coach Angela Jackson, played their home games at the Emil and Patricia Jones Convocation Center as new members of the Western Athletic Conference. The Cougars finished the season winless in WAC play.

Roster

Schedule and results
Source

|-
!colspan=9 style="background:#006400; color:#FFFFFF;"| Regular Season

|-
!colspan=9 style="background:#FFFFFF; color:#006400;"| 2014 WAC women's basketball tournament

See also
 2013–14 Chicago State Cougars men's basketball team

References

Chicago State Cougars women's basketball seasons
Chicago State
2010s in Chicago
Chicago State
Chicago State